Colonel Sir Michael Picton Ansell, CBE, DSO (26 March 1905 – 17 February 1994) was a soldier, show jumping rider, polo player, and horse show administrator.

Early life
Ansell was born on 26 March 1905 at the Curragh, County Kildare. His father George Ansell died in the First World War, while serving as a lieutenant colonel in the British Army.  After attending St Michael's Westgate-in-Sea and Wellington he went to Royal Military College, Sandhurst.

Military career
In 1924 he was commissioned into the 5th Royal Inniskilling Dragoon Guards and in the 1930s was a cavalry officer, show jumping rider, and international polo player. He was a Commander by 1935. His service number was 30796.

In France in March 1940, during World War II, he was given charge of the 1st Lothians and Border Horse, becoming the British Army's youngest commanding officer at the time. He won the Distinguished Service Order (DSO), but was shortly afterwards wounded in the hand and eyes by "friendly fire", blinding him permanently, and then became a prisoner of war (POW). All four fingers on his injured left hand were later amputated. He was repatriated from a German POW camp in 1943.

From 1957 to 1962 he was Colonel of the 5th Royal Inniskilling Dragoon Guards.

Showjumping
An invitation to take up the position of chairman of the British Showjumping Association led to him being credited with revitalising the sport. He restarted the Royal International Horse Show and initiated the Horse of the Year Show. He was Chairman of the British Horse Society and Chaired the British Showjumping Association from 1945 until 1964. He  was the first president of the British Equestrian Federation.

Honours/Affiliations
In 1967, when his address was given as "Pillhead House, Bideford", he was High Sheriff of Devon. He was President of St Dunstan's, a charity for blind servicemen, from 1977 to 1986.

Picton was made a Commander of the Order of the British Empire (CBE) in the 1951 New Year Honours and a Knight Bachelor (Kt) in the 1968 New Year Honours. 

He appeared on the television programme This Is Your Life on 28 March 1960, and as a castaway on the BBC Radio programme Desert Island Discs on 14 July 1973. 

His autobiography, Soldier On, was published in 1973. It had a foreword by the Duke of Edinburgh. His final book, Leopard: the story of my horse, featured a foreword by Prince Charles. 

In 1977, he was a recipient of the Silver Olympic Order.

Death
He died on 17 February 1994 in Brighton, England, aged 88.

Bibliography

References

External links
White City - The Man Behind The Horse Show 1955 British Pathe newsreel, showing Ansell at work at the International Horse Show
Background on Butlins Show

1905 births
1994 deaths
Military personnel from County Kildare
Irish amputees
British World War II prisoners of war
World War II prisoners of war held by Germany
British show jumping riders
Graduates of the Royal Military College, Sandhurst
People from County Kildare
Commanders of the Order of the British Empire
Knights Bachelor
British Army personnel of World War II
British blind people
5th Royal Inniskilling Dragoon Guards officers
Sportspeople from Bideford
High Sheriffs of Devon
Lothians and Border Horse officers
British male equestrians
Recipients of the Olympic Order
Military personnel from Bideford